Newton Crain Blanchard (January 29, 1849 – June 22, 1922) was a United States representative, U.S. senator, and the 33rd governor of Louisiana.

Personal life 
Born in Rapides Parish in Central Louisiana, he completed academic studies, studied law in Alexandria in 1868, and graduated from the Tulane University Law School in 1870 (then named the University of Louisiana). He was admitted to the bar and commenced practice in Shreveport in 1871; in 1879 he was a delegate to the State constitutional convention.

In 1873 he married Mary Emma Barrett, the daughter of Capt. William W. Barrett, an officer in the Confederate army. Their daughter, Mary Ethel Blanchard, married Leonard Rutherford Smith.

Political career 
Blanchard was elected as a Democrat to the 47th and to the six succeeding Congresses and served from March 4, 1881, until his resignation, effective March 12, 1894.  While in the House of Representatives, he was chairman of the Committee on Rivers and Harbors (50th through 53rd Congresses). He was appointed and subsequently elected as a Democrat to the U.S. Senate to fill the vacancy caused by the resignation of Edward Douglass White, who was appointed to the United States Supreme Court. Blanchard served in the Senate from March 12, 1894, to March 3, 1897; he was not a candidate for a full term in 1896. While in the Senate, Blanchard was chairman of the Committee on Improvement of the Mississippi River and its Tributaries (Fifty-third Congress).

Elected associate justice of the Louisiana Supreme Court, Blanchard served from 1897 to 1903, when he resigned. Blanchard became the highly qualified Democratic nominee for governor in 1904. He was elected and was governor from 1904 to 1908, and thereafter resumed the practice of law in Shreveport.

As governor, he appointed Sheriff David Theophilus Stafford of Rapides Parish, a son of Leroy Augustus Stafford, a Confederate brigadier general mortally wounded in the American Civil War, as the Louisiana adjutant general.

In 1913, Blanchard was again a member of the State constitutional convention, this time serving as president. He died in Shreveport in 1922 and was interned at Greenwood Cemetery.

References

External links

State of Louisiana - Biography 
Cemetery Memorial by La-Cemeteries

1849 births
1922 deaths
Democratic Party governors of Louisiana
Louisiana lawyers
Tulane University alumni
Tulane University Law School alumni
People from Rapides Parish, Louisiana
Politicians from Shreveport, Louisiana
Justices of the Louisiana Supreme Court
Democratic Party United States senators from Louisiana
Democratic Party members of the United States House of Representatives from Louisiana
Burials in Louisiana
19th-century American lawyers